Please ... Die! is the third full-length album by the death metal band, Carnal Forge. It was released in 2001.

Track listing
 "Butchered, Slaughtered, Strangled, Hanged" – 2:28
 "Hand of Doom" – 3:48
 "Fuel for Fire" – 2:00
 "Totalitarian Torture" – 3:01
 "Everything Dies" – 2:56
 "Slaves" – 2:15
 "Welcome to Your Funeral" – 3:34
 "Please... Die! (Aren't You Dead Yet?)" – 2:20
 "Becoming Dust" – 3:18
 "No Resurrection" – 2:37
 "A World All Soaked in Blood" – 3:07
 "A Higher Level of Pain" – 5:30

Credits 
 Stefan Westerberg – Drums
 Jari Kuusisto – Guitar
 Jonas Kjellgren – Vocals
 Petri Kuusisto – Guitar
 Lars Lindén – Bass

2001 albums
Carnal Forge albums